Ferragosto in bikini is a 1960 Italian comedy film directed by Marino Girolami. The film is named after a hit song of musical group Quartetto Cetra, who also makes a brief cameo appearance.

Cast 

 Walter Chiari: Walter
 Ennio Girolami: Dario
 Valeria Fabrizi: Ainé
 Lauretta Masiero: Paola Piccoli
 Raimondo Vianello: Ragionier Piccoli
 Marisa Merlini: Marta
 Mario Carotenuto: Cavalier Bonaccorsi
 Gérard Landry: Franz Heinrich
 Bice Valori: Gladys
 Mara Fiè: Elena
 Alberto Talegalli: Bagnante paesano
 Carlo Delle Piane: Carlo
 Toni Ucci: Raffaele
 Tiberio Murgia: Carmelo Pappalardo
 Luigi Pavese: Commedator Cazzaniga
 Virgilio Vidor: Bambino che discute con il Cavaliere
 Elyane Pade: Denise
 Nietta Zocchi: Miss Porro
 Dori Dorica: moglie del bagnante paesano
 Enzo Garinei: bagnante delle parole crociate
 Ciccio Barbi: segretario del cavaliere 
 Tino Bianchi: Dr. Labianca
 Silvio Bagolini: Subacqueo
 Pina Gallini: Bagnante

References

External links

1960 films
1960 comedy films
Italian comedy films
Films directed by Marino Girolami
1960s Italian films